Centre Municipal Airport  is a city-owned, public-use airport located three nautical miles (4 mi, 6 km) east of the central business district of Centre, a city in Cherokee County, Alabama, United States. It is owned by the City of Centre.

This airport is included in the FAA's National Plan of Integrated Airport Systems for 2011–2015 and 2009–2013, both of which categorized it as a general aviation facility.

This airport has been closed.

Facilities and aircraft 
Centre Municipal Airport covers an area of 43 acres (17 ha) at an elevation of 619 feet (189 m) above mean sea level. It has one runway designated 9/27 with an asphalt surface measuring 3,401 by 80 feet (1,037 x 24 m).

For the 12-month period ending April 28, 2010, the airport had 4,325 aircraft operations, an average of 11 per day: 81.5% general aviation and 18.5% military. At that time there were 8 aircraft based at this airport, all single-engine.

See also 
 Centre-Piedmont-Cherokee County Regional Airport
 List of airports in Alabama

References

External links 

 Aerial image as of February 1997 from USGS The National Map

Defunct airports in Alabama
Airports in Alabama
Transportation buildings and structures in Cherokee County, Alabama